Gornji Lakoš is a village southwest of Lendava in the Prekmurje region of Slovenia.

Name
The name Gornji Lakoš literally means 'upper Lakoš', contrasting with neighboring Dolnji Lakoš (literally, 'lower Lakoš'), which is about  lower in elevation. The Hungarian name Felsőlakos semantically corresponds to the Slovene name and also means 'upper Lakoš'.

Church
The local church in the settlement is dedicated to Saint Stephen and belongs to the Parish of Lendava.

References

External links
Gornji Lakoš on Geopedia

Populated places in the Municipality of Lendava